The Westlink M7 Motorway is a  tolled urban motorway in Sydney, New South Wales that is part of the Sydney Orbital Network. Owned by the NorthWestern Roads (NWR) Group, it connects three motorways: the M5 South-West Motorway at Prestons, the M4 Western Motorway at Eastern Creek, and the M2 Hills Motorway at Baulkham Hills. It opened on 16 December 2005, eight months ahead of schedule.

The M7 cycleway runs parallel to Westlink M7.

History 
Western Sydney is the fastest growing part of the Sydney metropolitan area. The Ring Road 5 and State Route 55 – and later State Route 77 – originally meant to bypass Sydney, had instead become primary arteries for the western suburbs.

In the late 1980s, with the intended construction of a BHP steel mill in Rooty Hill, Blacktown City Council required BHP to construct an arterial route that allowed industrial traffic to bypass the Rooty Hill CBD and the newly opened Davis Overpass. A  two-lane road named Phillip Parkway was constructed between Woodstock Avenue and Eastern Road and opened to traffic in July 1992. The alignment of Phillip Parkway would eventually be the preferred alignment of the Western Sydney Orbital two years later in 1994.

By the late 1990s and early 2000s, Western Sydney had become the third-biggest producer of Australia's GDP, after the Sydney CBD and Melbourne. The growth of industrial and residential areas brought about a massive increase in traffic on its local roads. This led to the planning of the Western Sydney Orbital, which, among its original purposes, was to serve the stillborn second international airport at Badgerys Creek.

In January 2001 the federal government made a commitment to progressively contribute A$356 million to the Western Sydney Orbital project, with the remaining A$1.5 billion required for the design and construction provided by the private sector. Planning approval was given by the NSW Minister for Planning in February 2002. The project was renamed Westlink M7 in July 2003.

The M7 Motorway was privately funded through an innovative construction contract method known as a “deed” to facilitate the expedition of the tendering phase; several deeds were drawn up based on the contractors proposals. More than 90 bridges (of four different types) and the largest shared path network in the Southern Hemisphere. The design, construct, operate and maintain contract worth at least A$2.0 billion was awarded to WSO (Western Sydney Orbital Pty Ltd) by the Roads & Traffic Authority. The design and construct portion of the contract valued at A$1.8 billion was awarded to a joint venture between Abigroup and Leighton Contractors (ALJV) with design work undertaken by a further joint venture by Maunsell AECOM and SMEC (Snowy Mountains Engineering Corporation) with further subcontracting to other designers (Arup) and independent verification by Sinclair Knight Merz (SKM).

The motorway was opened to traffic in 2005. WSO (commonly known as Westlink) operate the motorway with maintenance subcontracted to Westlink Services and tolling to ROAM. With its opening, Metroad 7 between Liverpool and Beecroft was transferred from Cumberland Highway to Westlink M7. Westlink M7 was the first Sydney motorway to be marked with an alphanumeric shield (M7) rather than the hexagonal Metroad shield.

On 25 December 2005, just 9 days after opening, the M7 suffered its first fatality: a 12-year-old boy died at Cecil Park when the four-wheel drive he was travelling in rolled down an embankment and onto Elizabeth Drive, almost crushing another car.

In 2020, WSO, then already a business of the NorthWestern Roads Group, submitted an unsolicited proposal to the NSW government to widen the M7 and construct the M7 and M12 Motorway interchange simultaneously. This was aimed to reduce the disruption to M7 traffic and provide project delivery efficiencies for the M7-M12 interchange. In August 2020, the proposal has moved to Stage 2 of the process with further progression to Stage 3 in May 2022.

Route 

The M7 begins at the Roden Cutler Interchange, a Y-junction with the M31 Hume Motorway and M5 South-West Motorway at Prestons, and weaves to the west of Liverpool to the junction of Elizabeth Road and Wallgrove Road in Abbotsbury. From then on it runs parallel to Wallgrove Road north towards the Great Western Highway and the Light Horse interchange, a stack junction with the M4. Continuing north, it leads to Minchinbury and follows alongside Rooty Hill Road up to Dean Park at an exit with Rooty Hill Road North and Richmond Road.

From this junction, the M7 turns eastward along the preserved Castlereagh Freeway corridor through Quakers Hill and Kings Langley up to the interchange with Old Windsor Road to Norwest Business Park and continues southeast to reconcile with the existing M2 Hills Motorway in Baulkham Hills. It is 4 lanes (2 lanes each way) for its entire length.

Light Horse Interchange
The Light Horse Interchange is the junction of the M4 and M7 motorways. The stack interchange is the largest of its type in the Southern Hemisphere. It was named in honour of an Australian World War One formation, the Australian Light Horse.

Tolls

Ownership
When first incorporated, WSO Co. Pty Limited (commonly known as Westlink) was a consortium owned by Transurban (40%), Macquarie Investment Group (MIG) (40%), Leighton (10%) and Abigroup (10%). The consortium was awarded the bid to develop Westlink M7 in October 2002, and entered into a 34-year concession period on 14 February 2003. Leighton and Abigroup were the contractors for the construction of M7.

When the M7 opened in December 2005, Transurban and MIG purchased an additional 5%
equity interest in Westlink M7 from Leighton and Abigroup. Subsequently, in 2006-2007, Abigroup sold its stake to Transurban and MIG, with the latter two having a 47.5% shareholding each and Leighton having a 5% shareholding.

In August 2008, Transurban and MIG exercised their pre-emptive rights and acquired Leighton's 5% stake equally, increasing their shareholding to 50% each. In December 2008, MIG announced it would sell its 50% stake of Westlink to Western Sydney Road Group (WSRG), of which MIG owned 50% and Queensland Investment Corporation (QIC) owning the other 50%. Transurban had the pre-emptive right to acquire MIG's share, but declined in January 2009 due to its high price. The sale to WSRG proceeded, and QIC and MIG each had 25% ownership of Westlink.

MIG was later restructured into Intoll and then acquired by the CPP Investment Board in December 2010. Since then, the Westlink M7 is owned by Transurban (50%), QIC (25%) and CPP (25%). In 2015, Westlink was reorganised under a new umbrella entity, NorthWestern Roads Group (NWR), with no changes in ownership. The NWR Group would also deliver and now tolls and operates the NorthConnex, opened in October 2020.

The 34-year concession to construct, operate and toll the M7 was originally due to expire on 14 February 2037. However, the concession was extended as part of the NorthConnex agreement between NWR and the NSW government and will expire in June 2048 instead.

Pricing 
The Westlink was built as a fully tolled, gateless motorway employing electronic payment, with an initial toll-free period that ended on 15 January 2006. The toll for a car or motorcycle was originally 29.91 cents per kilometre, capped after  at $5.98. On 1 April 2006, this increased to 30.07 cents per kilometre, capped after  at $6.01.

Tolls are adjusted quarterly according to the CPI and heavy vehicle tolls are three times the toll for a car and motorcycle.

Exits and interchanges

See also

 Freeways in Australia
 Freeways in Sydney
 M7 cycleway

References

External links 
 Westlink M7 Official Site
 Ozroads Westlink M7 page

Highways in Sydney
Toll roads in Australia